The Wichita Falls Spudders were a minor league baseball team that formed in 1920 and played its last game in 1957. They were based in Wichita Falls, Texas.

The first Spudders team ran from 1920–1932 and played in the Texas League as an affiliate of the Pittsburgh Pirates, Chicago Cubs and St. Louis Browns. In 1927, they won the league championship and the Dixie Series, a postseason interleague championship between the winners of the Southern Association and the Texas League. That team moved to Longview, Texas in 1932 and became the Longview Cannibals. They moved to the Dixie League in 1933 and then the West Dixie League from 1934–1935 and the East Texas League from 1936–1939. They were affiliated with the Chicago White Sox from 1934–1939. The team disbanded after the 1939 season.

A second team, also called the Spudders operated from 1941–1942 in the West Texas–New Mexico League as an affiliate of the Cincinnati Reds.

The Third Spudders team operated from 1947–1954 as part of the Big State League (1937–1953) and Longhorn League (1954). This team was affiliated with the St. Louis Browns (1948–1951), Boston Braves/Milwaukee Braves (1952–1953) and Washington Senators (1954). They moved away and became the Sweetwater Spudders for the 1955 season.

The final Spudders team operated from 1956–1957 in the Big State League as an affiliate of the Brooklyn Dodgers. They disbanded halfway through the 1957 season.

References

External links
Baseball Reference

Defunct minor league baseball teams
Defunct Texas League teams
Defunct baseball teams in Texas
Professional baseball teams in Texas
Chicago Cubs minor league affiliates
St. Louis Browns minor league affiliates
Cincinnati Reds minor league affiliates
Pittsburgh Pirates minor league affiliates
Boston Braves minor league affiliates
Milwaukee Braves minor league affiliates
Washington Senators minor league affiliates
Brooklyn Dodgers minor league affiliates
Sports in Wichita Falls, Texas
1911 establishments in Texas
1957 disestablishments in Texas
Baseball teams established in 1911
Baseball teams disestablished in 1957
Defunct Big State League teams
Longhorn League teams